Swedish boy band E.M.D. have released three studio albums and eleven singles, between 2007 and 2010.

Discography

Studio albums

Singles

References

Discographies of Swedish artists
Pop music group discographies